"See the Day" is a fifth single by German band Hypetraxx, which was released in 2000. The song peaked at number 24 on the German singles chart.

Track listing

Charts

Release history

References 

2000 singles
2000 songs
EMI Records singles